The Frye-Randolph House and Fryemont Inn are a pair of historic properties on Fryemont Road in Bryson City, North Carolina.  The two buildings occupy a prominent site overlooking the Tuckasegee River and Bryson City, and are well-known local landmarks.  The house is an L-shaped wood-frame structure, whose oldest portion was built c. 1895 by Amos Frye, a prominent local lawyer and landowner.  The inn is a rustic mountain lodge, two stories high, part of which is clad in bark shingles.  It was built by the Fryes in 1923, and is a well-preserved example of a period vacation hotel.

The properties, now under separate ownership, were listed on the National Register of Historic Places in 1983.  The inn is still in operation.

See also
National Register of Historic Places listings in Swain County, North Carolina

References

External links
Fryemont Inn website

Hotel buildings on the National Register of Historic Places in North Carolina
Commercial buildings completed in 1895
Buildings and structures in Swain County, North Carolina
National Register of Historic Places in Swain County, North Carolina